The 1990–91 Lebanese Premier League season was the 31st season of the Lebanese Premier League, the top Lebanese professional league for association football clubs in the country, established in 1934.

Ansar, who were the defending champions, won their third consecutive—and overall—Lebanese Premier League title.

League table

References

External links 
 RSSSF

Lebanese Premier League seasons
Lebanon
1